Garhi is a small village in Banswara District of  Rajasthan.

Notes

Villages in Banswara district